Bobby Lawrie (born 14 November 1947) is a Scottish former footballer, who played for Partick Thistle and Stranraer in the Scottish Football League in the 1960s and 1970s. Lawrie was part of the Partick Thistle side that surprisingly won the 1971 Scottish League Cup Final by 4–1 against Celtic, with Lawrie scoring the second Thistle goal.

References

1947 births
Living people
Scottish footballers
Footballers from Irvine, North Ayrshire
Association football wingers
Scottish Football League players
Irvine Meadow XI F.C. players
Troon F.C. players
Partick Thistle F.C. players
Stranraer F.C. players
Ardeer Thistle F.C. players